The Mary Rogers Kimball House, also known as the Kimball House, is located at 2236 St. Mary's Avenue in Downtown Omaha, Nebraska.

It is an official Omaha City Landmark and also is listed on the National Register of Historic Places.  It was designed by Thomas Rogers Kimball.

References

Houses on the National Register of Historic Places in Omaha, Nebraska
Thomas Rogers Kimball buildings